Steven William Morison (born 29 August 1983) is a football manager and former professional footballer who played as a striker. He was most recently the manager of EFL Championship club Cardiff City.

Morison started his career at Northampton Town at the age of 16, progressing through the club's centre of excellence. He made his first-team debut in 2002. Morison joined Conference South club Bishop's Stortford for an undisclosed fee in November 2004. After just under two years playing regularly at Stortford, he signed for Stevenage Borough for a "small four-figure fee" in August 2006. During his first season with the club, Morison scored the winning goal in the 2007 FA Trophy Final, the first competitive cup final to be held at the new Wembley Stadium. He also helped the club win the FA Trophy again in May 2009, in what was ultimately his last game for the club.

Having scored 86 times in 151 appearances during his three seasons at Stevenage, Morison joined Millwall for £130,000 ahead of the 2009–10 season. He helped the club to secure promotion to the Championship in his first season there. He signed for Premier League club Norwich City in June 2011. After scoring 12 goals in 59 games for Norwich in the top tier of English football, Morison signed for Leeds United in January 2013. He rejoined Millwall on a season-long loan after just five months at Leeds. He returned to Leeds for the 2014–15 season, before signing for Millwall on a permanent basis in August 2015.

Morison scored the winning goal in the 2017 EFL League One play-off final to help Millwall achieve promotion back into the Championship during the 2016–17 season. He played over 300 games for Millwall over his two spells with the club, scoring 92 goals, which ranks him in third place in Millwall's all-time record goalscorers list. Morison joined Shrewsbury Town on an initial season-long loan agreement in June 2019. Although the transfer was made permanent at the start of the 2019–20 season, Morison announced his retirement from playing in October 2019. Having already gained his coaching badges, he was appointed Northampton Town's under-18 coach, before later joining Cardiff City as the lead coach of the club's under-23 team. Morison was appointed as first-team manager of Cardiff City in November 2021.

Morison also earned eight caps for the England C team, scoring three goals. Morison qualified to play Wales through his Welsh ancestry, and made his senior international debut in August 2010. He went on to represent Wales 20 times, scoring one goal.

Early life
Born in Enfield, London, Morison attended Enfield Grammar School, leaving school at the age of 16 with one GCSE qualification. He went on to earn a National Diploma in sports science.

Club career

Northampton and Bishop's Stortford
Morison joined Northampton Town as part of the club's youth system after a successful trial period with the club, having also spent time on trial at Leicester City. When Morison turned 18, he signed a two-year professional contract with Northampton. He impressed manager Kevan Broadhurst and subsequently made his debut at the end of the 2001–02 season in a 2–2 draw against Cambridge United. The following season, Morison played a largely peripheral role as a substitute, playing 15 games, scoring his first goal for Northampton in a 2–2 draw against Plymouth Argyle. He played just five times during the 2003–04 season, scoring once. He was offered a new six-month contract at the club on 10 June 2004, and was told by manager Colin Calderwood that he had to prove his worth at the club.

Morison played the opening five games of the club's 2004–05 season, but failed to score. He featured two more times for the club, scoring Northampton's equaliser away at Darlington on 18 September 2004. The following month, Morison signed for Conference South club Bishop's Stortford for an undisclosed fee. He scored on his debut in a 1–1 draw against Redbridge. He helped Stortford reach the FA Trophy semi-final and Morison ended the season as the club's top goalscorer, as well as finishing as the 2004–05 FA Trophy top goalscorer. The following season, Morison struggled for form at the start of the club's league season, and was used as a substitute during the first two months of the season. He started in a game against Histon in November 2005, scoring a hat-trick in a 5–0 win. Morison scored 15 times during the season.

Stevenage Borough

He started the 2006–07 season by scoring two goals in two games for Stortford, before joining Conference National club Stevenage Borough on a two-year deal in August 2006 for a "small four figure fee". He scored on his debut in a 3–2 defeat against Crawley Town on 19 August 2006, following this up by scoring a hat-trick against Morecambe in a 3–3 draw at Christie Park in the club's next match. Morison scored regularly for Stevenage during his debut season, helping the club to success in the FA Trophy, finishing as the competition's top goalscorer with eight goals. This included scoring the winning goal in the final in May 2007 against Kidderminster Harriers, as Stevenage came from two goals behind to win 3–2 at Wembley Stadium in front of a competition record crowd of 53,262. Morison played 53 games during the season, scoring 34 times in all competitions, finishing as the club's top goalscorer for the season.

Morison continued his scoring form throughout Stevenage's 2007–08 season, scoring 22 times in 43 appearances, as the club narrowly missed out on the Conference Premier play-offs. At the end of the season, Morison handed in a transfer request as he sought a return to the Football League. Despite the club accepting the request, and receiving interest from League Two club Crewe Alexandra, no transfer materialised and Morison signed a new three-year contract at Stevenage. There was a clause in the contract that stated he could leave the club at the end of the 2008–09 season for a pre-arranged fee if Stevenage did not win promotion into the Football League.

He scored 30 goals in 51 games for the Hertfordshire club during the 2008–09 season, and captained the team for the majority of the season. His season started with Stevenage losing 5–0 away to Wrexham; a game in which Morison was sent-off for an "off-the-ball headbutt". He missed the next three games through suspension, but returned in early September 2008, following up a hat-trick against eventual champions Burton Albion with a brace against Altrincham. He later scored goals in away victories to both Weymouth and York City respectively, as well as scoring in a 3–1 win over Kidderminster Harriers to ensure Stevenage made the play-offs, finishing in the final play-off spot. Morison played regularly during the club's successful FA Trophy campaign in the same season, scoring seven times in seven games, including once in the 2–0 victory against York in the final on 9 May 2009. Stevenage failed to achieve promotion to League Two, thus activating a release clause in his contract. Morison was allowed to leave and, shortly after, agreed personal terms with League One club Millwall on 15 May 2009, with a fee of £130,000 being agreed for the transfer. During his three-year tenure at the club, Morison made 152 appearances, scoring 89 goals. This record places him as the club's second highest goalscorer in their history. Morison was also included in the club's 'Wall of Fame', which features "the six greatest players in Stevenage's history as voted for by the club's supporters".

Millwall
 He made his debut for Millwall in the opening game of the 2009–10 season, starting in the club's 1–1 draw with Southampton on 8 August 2009; providing the assist for Millwall's equaliser. A month later, Morison scored his first goal for Millwall in a 3–1 victory over Huddersfield Town. Having scored seven goals in five match in March 2010, Morison was named Football League One Player of the Month. He scored in Millwall's 2–0 win against Huddersfield Town,on 18 May 2010, his 23rd goal of the season, as Millwall progressed to the League One play-off final, where they beat Swindon Town 1–0 at Wembley Stadium on 6 June 2010; Morison's third successive victory at the stadium. He scored 23 times in 52 appearances during his debut season at Millwall

He started the 2010–11 season by assisting two of Millwall's goals in the club's opening day 3–0 victory against Bristol City at Ashton Gate on 7 August 2010. In the club's following league match, he scored two headed goals as Millwall beat Hull City at The Den. It was reported that Millwall rejected a £2million offer for Morison from Nottingham Forest on 15 October 2010, with Millwall manager Kenny Jackett stating there is "no chance" that Morison will be sold in the January transfer window. A day later, Jackett said the club had not received a formal bid for Morison from Forest. Morison subsequently signed a new -year contract with Millwall on 5 February 2011, ending transfer speculation about his long-term commitment to the club. Morison ended the season having scored 17 goals for Millwall in 43 appearances.

Norwich City

At the end of the 2010–11 season, Morison handed in a written transfer request amid speculation about a move to newly promoted Premier League club Norwich City. Millwall rejected the transfer request. A day later, Morison revealed "Norwich have made a couple of bids that have been turned down so I've done what I've done. I want to play in the Premier League, I might not get another opportunity". Millwall accepted an offer from Norwich for Morison after the two clubs agreed a fee for the player on 2 June 2011, it was the fourth bid Norwich had made for Morison. He signed for the club on a three-year contract for an undisclosed fee on 6 June. Morison made his Norwich City debut against Wigan Athletic during the club's first game of the 2011–12 season, playing 75 minutes of the match in a 1–1 draw. He assisted Norwich's equalising goal, beating Adrián López Rodríguez on the right wing and providing a cross that was ultimately turned in by Wes Hoolahan. He scored his first goal for the club in Norwich's first home win of the season, a 2–1 victory against Sunderland on 26 September 2011. He scored his tenth goal of the season in a 3–3 draw away to Arsenal at Emirates Stadium on 5 May 2012. Morison's late strike from a tight angle drew Norwich level after they had trailed 3–2 with five minutes remaining. During his first season at the club, he scored ten goals in 37 appearances.

The following season, under new Norwich manager Chris Hughton, Morison featured predominantly as a substitute, starting just four games during the first half of the 2012–13 season. He scored his first goal of the season in a 5–2 home defeat to Liverpool on 29 September 2012, a match in which he started. Morison made his last appearance for Norwich in a 4–3 defeat to Manchester City in the club's final game of 2012. He made 59 appearances during his one-and-a-half year spell at the club, scoring 12 goals.

Leeds United
On the last day of the 2013 January transfer window, Morison signed for Championship club Leeds United as part of a swap deal. The transfer involved Luciano Becchio moving to Norwich, as well as Norwich paying Leeds a "further undisclosed sum". On signing Morison, the then-Leeds manager Neil Warnock said that – "Steve meets all the requirements of the striker we've been looking to bring in. For me, he is a player who has everything. He can score goals from anywhere – whether it's 25 yards or a tap-in – he has pace, and he has all the attributes you want". He made his Leeds debut on 9 February 2013, playing the whole match in the club's 2–2 draw against Wolverhampton Wanderers at Molineux. Morison scored his first goal for the club on his home debut on 20 February 2013, scoring the second goal in a 2–0 victory over Blackpool. He scored three goals in 16 appearances during the second half of the 2012–13 season.

Millwall loan
A day after returning for pre-season training with Leeds, on 28 June 2013, Morison joined former club Millwall, also of the Championship, on a season-long loan deal. On rejoining Millwall, Morison stated – "I'm pleased to be back here. If anybody has any doubts about me all I'd say is that I aim to score plenty of goals for Millwall and help this club to greater success". Morison made 41 appearances during the loan agreement, of which 25 were starting, and scored eight times as Millwall finished the season in 19th-place in the Championship.

Return to Leeds
He returned to Leeds upon the conclusion of his loan, with new Leeds chairman Massimo Cellino stating Morison was in Dave Hockaday's plans for the 2014–15 season, but that "he needs to show if he's still a good player because he used to be". Morison missed the opening games of the season through injury, making his first league appearance for Leeds in over a year as a substitute against Huddersfield Town on 20 September 2014. He scored his first goal for Leeds in over two years when he scored a volley in a 2–1 defeat to Charlton Athletic on 19 April 2015. He made 26 appearances during the season, scoring twice.

Rejoining Millwall permanently

Morison rejoined League One club Millwall for a third spell on 4 August 2015, signing on a permanent basis for an undisclosed fee. He scored in the first game upon his return in a 2–1 victory at Shrewsbury Town on 8 August 2015. Morison scored 19 times in 57 appearances during the season, as Millwall were defeated 3–1 in the 2016 Football League One play-off final on 29 May 2016. He remained at Millwall for the 2016–17 season and started the season by scoring six goals in eight games. He played 50 times that season, scoring 19 times. This included three goals in the League One play-offs, as well as the winning goal in the 2017 EFL League One play-off final as Millwall won promotion back to the Championship. Morison's goal, a volley scored in the 85th-minute of the match, was the only goal of the game as Millwall defeated Bradford City at Wembley Stadium on 20 May 2017.

Morison triggered an appearance-based clause in his contract on 14 December 2017, meaning his contract was automatically extended until 2019. He made 48 appearances during the 2017–18 season, scoring five times, as Millwall consolidated their place in their first season back in the Championship after finishing in eighth place. Morison scored once in 44 appearances during the club's 2018–19 season. He played over 300 games across his three spells with Millwall, scoring 92 goals in all competitions, which ranks him in third place in the club's all-time record goalscorers.

Shrewsbury Town
Morison joined League One club Shrewsbury Town on 19 June 2019, on an initial season-long loan, playing under Shrewsbury manager Sam Ricketts, who he had played alongside for Wales. He made his competitive debut for the club on 3 August 2019, starting in a 1–0 home win against Portsmouth. The loan agreement was made permanent on 8 August 2019, running until the end of the 2019–20 season. He made nine appearances for Shrewsbury during the opening months of the 2019–20 season. Morison announced his retirement from playing with immediate effect on 18 October 2019, in order to begin his coaching career at the academy of his first club, Northampton Town.

International career

England C
Morison was called up to the England C team, who represent England at non-league level, in November 2006, scoring in a European Challenge Trophy game against the Netherlands in which Morison played both games against Grenada and Barbados respectively, scoring against the former in a 1–1 draw. Morison played eight times for the England C team, scoring three goals, before his age meant that he was ineligible to be selected.

Wales

In May 2010, it was identified that Morison was eligible to represent Wales due to Welsh ancestry – as his grandmother was born in Tredegar, near Ebbw Vale. Wales assistant manager Roy Evans was present to watch Morison in Millwall's 1–0 victory against Swindon Town, while Morison "registered his interest" in representing Wales. In July 2010, Wales boss John Toshack named Morison in the Wales squad for a friendly against Luxembourg in Llanelli on 11 August 2010. Morison started in Wales' 5–1 victory against Luxembourg, playing the whole match and assisting Ashley Williams' goal.

Wales manager Gary Speed called Morison up for the country's two UEFA Euro 2012 qualifiers in September 2011. He scored his first international goal for Wales in a 2–1 victory against Montenegro, played at Cardiff City Stadium on 2 September 2011. Morison's goal came from six yards out, sliding to make contact with David Vaughan's low cross. The victory was Wales' first of the qualification group. Morison earned his 20th and final cap in a 2–0 defeat to Croatia in Osijek on 16 October 2012.

Coaching career
Morison earned his first coaching badge at Protec Football Academy during his playing career. He subsequently earned his UEFA Pro Licence and, after retiring as a player in October 2019, began coaching at the academies of former clubs Northampton Town and Millwall.

Cardiff City
Morison was appointed as the lead coach of the Cardiff City under-23 team on 10 February 2020. The move meant that he would be working with Cardiff manager Neil Harris, who he played alongside and was managed by at Millwall. Following the sacking of Mick McCarthy in October 2021, Morison was placed in temporary charge of the first team. His first match as caretaker manager was a 3–3 draw away at Stoke City with the team having been 3–0 down with 25 minutes remaining, this result ending Cardiff's club-record run of eight defeats in a row. Cardiff earned their first win in 10 matches in Morison's third match in caretaker charge, with a 2–1 victory against Huddersfield Town on 6 November 2021. 

Morison was appointed first-team manager on a contract until the end of the 2021–22 season on 12 November 2021, with club owner Vincent Tan stating that he had been impressed by the more attacking brand of football played during Morison's three matches as caretaker manager. Morison signed a contract extension on 2 March 2022,  until the summer of 2023, after leading the team clear of the relegation zone and impressing the board of directors with "a progressive and clearly identifiable playing style". He was named as the EFL Championship Manager of the Month for March 2022 after Cardiff won three matches and remained unbeaten that month.

Following a poor start to the season, Morison was sacked on 18 September 2022 with the club sitting in 18th position in the league table.

Style of play
Morison played as a striker and has been described as a "player who is always in the right place at the right time". Ahead of the 2008–09 season, Stevenage manager Graham Westley sent Morison to a training camp to work on his turn of pace. He also described him as a player that "no defender would want to play against" due to his height, pace, and strength. In May 2010, Millwall manager Kenny Jackett said that Morison "has a lot of strength and pace, which he uses on defenders perfectly", as well as referring to him as a "physical threat" because of his aerial ability. Nick Szczepanik of The Times stated that Morison plays with "a fearless, all-action style".

Personal life
When Morison played part-time football with Bishop's Stortford in 2004, he worked for a shredding company, "getting up at four in the morning shredding paper around London". However, he said he "could not handle the early starts" and subsequently got "an easier job indoors" doing administration work in an office, where he met his wife; they have had a son together, called Fenton. He quit the administration job immediately after signing for Stevenage in August 2006.

Morison has always had an interest in greyhound racing, ever since he attended Walthamstow Stadium as a boy. In January 2013, Morison set up a greyhound racing syndicate alongside his former strike partner at Norwich City, Grant Holt.

Career statistics

Club

International

International goals
Wales' goal tally first

Managerial statistics

Honours

As a player
Stevenage Borough
FA Trophy: 2006–07, 2008–09

Millwall
League One play-offs: 2009–10, 2016–17

Individual
Stevenage Player of the Year: 2007–08
League One Player of the Month: March 2010
Millwall Player of the Year: 2016–17

As a manager
Individual
EFL Championship Manager of the Month: March 2022

References

External links

1983 births
Living people
Footballers from Enfield, London
English footballers
England semi-pro international footballers
Welsh footballers
Wales international footballers
Association football forwards
Northampton Town F.C. players
Bishop's Stortford F.C. players
Stevenage F.C. players
Millwall F.C. players
Norwich City F.C. players
Leeds United F.C. players
Shrewsbury Town F.C. players
English Football League players
National League (English football) players
Premier League players
People educated at Enfield Grammar School
English people of Welsh descent
Articles containing video clips
Northampton Town F.C. non-playing staff
Millwall F.C. non-playing staff
Cardiff City F.C. non-playing staff
Cardiff City F.C. managers
English Football League managers